The Iowa Hawkeyes softball team represents University of Iowa in NCAA Division I college softball.  The team participates in the Big Ten Conference. The Hawkeyes are currently led by head coach Renee Luers-Gillispie. The team plays its home games at Bob Pearl Softball Field located on the university's campus.

History

Coaching history

Championships

Conference championships

Conference tournament championships

Coaching staff

Awards
Big Ten Player of the Year
Terri McFarland, 1990
Karen Jackson, 1991
Debbie Bilbao, 1997

Big Ten Pitcher of the Year
Karen Jackson, 1994
Kristi Hanks, 2000
Kristi Hanks, 2001
Lisa Birocci, 2003

Big Ten Freshman of the Year
Terri McFarland, 1989
Karren Jackson, 1991
Kari Knopf, 1994
Jessica Bashor, 2000
Stacy May, 2003

Big Ten Coach of the Year
Gayle Blevins, 1989
Gayle Blevins, 1997
Gayle Blevins, 2000

References